Reuben O. Davis (January 18, 1813 – October 14, 1890) was a United States representative from Mississippi.

Born in Winchester, Tennessee into a family of Welsh origin, he moved with his parents to Alabama about 1818. His grandfather Joseph Davis was born in Wales in 1763 and emigrated to Virginia. Reuben Davis attended the public schools. Later, he studied medicine, but practiced only a few years, when he abandoned the profession. He then studied law, was admitted to the bar in 1834, and commenced practice in Aberdeen, Mississippi.

Davis "became one of the most successful criminal lawyers in the South", and was elected prosecuting attorney for the sixth judicial district 1835–1839. He was an unsuccessful Whig candidate for the Twenty-sixth Congress in 1838. He was then appointed by Governor Tilghman Tucker as a judge of the high court of appeals in 1842, but after four months' service resigned.

Davis served as colonel of the Second Regiment of Mississippi Volunteers in the Mexican–American War. After the war, he was a member of the Mississippi House of Representatives 1855–1857. He was elected as a Democrat to the Thirty-fifth and Thirty-sixth Congresses and served from March 4, 1857, to January 12, 1861, when he withdrew.

According to the US Census, the Davis household kept 4 slaves in 1840, 18 in 1850, and 42 in 1860. During the American Civil War, Davis served in the Confederate Army as brigadier general. After the war, he resumed the practice of law. He was an unsuccessful Greenback candidate for the Forty-sixth Congress in 1878. During this period he purchased a Greek Revival style house in Aberdeen, Mississippi, known as Sunset Hill, and wrote his Recollections of Mississippi and Mississippians. He died suddenly, while in Huntsville, Alabama in 1890 and was buried at the Odd Fellows Cemetery in Aberdeen.

References

 Retrieved on 2008-10-18
 Davis, Reuben. Recollections of Mississippi and Mississippians. Boston and New York: Houghton, Mifflin and Company, 1890. Rev. ed., with a new introd. by William D. McCain. Pref. and an expanded index by Laura D. S. Harrell. Hattiesburg: University and College Press of Mississippi, 1972.

1813 births
1890 deaths
People from Winchester, Tennessee
American people of Welsh descent
American slave owners
19th-century American politicians
Mississippi Whigs
Mississippi Greenbacks
Justices of the Mississippi Supreme Court
Democratic Party members of the United States House of Representatives from Mississippi
Members of the Confederate House of Representatives from Mississippi
American military personnel of the Mexican–American War
Confederate States Army brigadier generals
19th-century American judges